Ro-27, originally named Submarine No. 58, was an Imperial Japanese Navy Kaichū-Type submarine of the Kaichū IV subclass. She was in commission from 1924 to 1937.

Design and description
The submarines of the Kaichu IV sub-class were an improved version of the preceding Kaichu III subclass, slightly larger, with heavier torpedoes, and with the deck gun mounted forward of the conning tower instead of aft of it. They displaced  surfaced and  submerged.

For surface running, the submarines were powered by two  Sulzer Mark II diesel engines, each driving one propeller shaft. When submerged each propeller was driven by a  electric motor. They could reach  on the surface and  underwater.

The submarines were armed with four internal bow  torpedo tubes and carried a total of eight torpedoes. They were also armed with a single  deck gun.

Construction and commissioning

Ro-27 was laid down as Submarine No. 58 on 16 July 1921 by the Yokosuka Naval Arsenal at Yokosuka, Japan. Launched on 22 July 1922, she was completed and commissioned on 13 July 1924.

Service history

Upon commissioning, Submarine No. 58 was attached to the Kure Naval District, and on 20 August 1924 she was assigned to Submarine Division 14 in Submarine Squadron 2 in the 2nd Fleet. On 1 November 1924, Submarine No. 58 was renamed Ro-27.

Submarine Division 14 was reassigned to the Kure Naval District on 1 August 1925, and on 18 August 1925 began duty with the Kure Defense Division. This lasted until 1 December 1925, when the division returned to Submarine Squadron 2 in the 2nd Fleet. On 6 April 1926, Ro-27 collided with her sister ship . Neither submarine suffered casualties.

On 1 December 1926, Submarine Division 14 was reassigned to the Kure Naval District, in which it remained until 1933. In the years that followed, the division had duty in the Kure Defense Division from 10 December 1928 to 1 December 1930 and from 1 October 1932 to 1 February 1933 and from 1 December 1933 to 15 November 1934 and underwent a refit in 1934.

Ro-27 was decommissioned on 10 December 1937 and placed in Fourth Reserve in the Kure Naval District. She was stricken from the Navy list on 1 April 1940. She served subsequently as the training hulk Heisan No. 7 at the submarine school at Kure, Japan. She was sold for scrap after World War II and scrapped at Iwakuni, Japan. Scrapping was completed in October 1947.

Notes

References
, History of Pacific War Vol.17 I-Gō Submarines, Gakken (Japan), January 1998, 
Rekishi Gunzō, History of Pacific War Extra, "Perfect guide, The submarines of the Imperial Japanese Forces", Gakken (Japan), March 2005, 
The Maru Special, Japanese Naval Vessels No.43 Japanese Submarines III, Ushio Shobō (Japan), September 1980, Book code 68343-44
The Maru Special, Japanese Naval Vessels No.132 Japanese Submarines I "Revised edition", Ushio Shobō (Japan), February 1988, Book code 68344-36
The Maru Special, Japanese Naval Vessels No.133 Japanese Submarines II "Revised edition", Ushio Shobō (Japan), March 1988, Book code 68344-37
The Maru Special, Japanese Naval Vessels No.135 Japanese Submarines IV, Ushio Shobō (Japan), May 1988, Book code 68344-39

Ro-26-class submarines
Kaichū type submarines
Ships built by Yokosuka Naval Arsenal
1922 ships
Maritime incidents in 1926